Brandon O'Neill (born ) is a Canadian male artistic gymnast, representing his nation at international competitions. He competed at world championships, including the 2005 World Artistic Gymnastics Championships in Melbourne.

References

1984 births
Living people
Canadian male artistic gymnasts
Place of birth missing (living people)
Gymnasts at the 2008 Summer Olympics
Olympic gymnasts of Canada
Pan American Games medalists in gymnastics
Universiade medalists in gymnastics
Pan American Games gold medalists for Canada
Gymnasts at the 2003 Pan American Games
Universiade gold medalists for Canada
Medalists at the 2005 Summer Universiade
Medalists at the 2003 Pan American Games
20th-century Canadian people
21st-century Canadian people